The 2012 Skycity Triple Crown was an Australian touring car motor race for V8 Supercars. It was held from the 15–17 June at the Hidden Valley Raceway in Darwin and was the sixth round of the 2012 International V8 Supercars Championship and the fifteenth time that the Supercars had visited Hidden Valley since the first event in 1998.

The weekend consisted of two races with Jamie Whincup from Triple Eight Race Engineering winning the first race of the weekend while fellow team-mate Craig Lowndes won the longer race of the two during the weekend.

Standings
 After 13 of 30 races.

Darwin
June 2012 sports events in Australia
Sport in Darwin, Northern Territory
2010s in the Northern Territory
Motorsport in the Northern Territory